Bagguley is a surname. Notable people with the surname include:

 Howard Bagguley (1909–1999), Canadian skier
 Richard Bagguley (born 1955), English muralist and artist
 Robert Bagguley (1873–1946), English cricketer
 William Bagguley (1866–1936), English cricketer

See also
 Baguley (disambiguation)